The Chief of the Defence Forces is the professional head of the Timor Leste Defence Force. He is responsible for the administration and the operational control of the East Timor military.

List of officeholders

Commander of FALINTIL (1975–2001)

Chief of the F-FDTL (2002–present)

References 

Military of East Timor
East Timor